The following Forbes list of Austrian billionaires is based on an annual assessment of wealth and assets compiled and published by Forbes magazine in 2021.

2021 Austrian billionaires list

See also
 List of billionaires
 List of wealthiest families

References

Net worth

Lists of people by wealth
Economy of Austria-related lists